Carlos Sebastián Alzamora Esquivel (born 27 September 1986) is a Chilean former footballer who played as a striker.

Personal life
His twin brother, is also a former professional footballer who worked as the general manager of Deportes La Serena following his retirement.

References

External links
 
 Carlos Alzamora at Football-Lineups

1986 births
Living people
Chilean twins
Twin sportspeople
Footballers from Santiago
Chilean footballers
Chilean expatriate footballers
Deportes La Serena footballers
Cobreloa footballers
Cobresal footballers
Club Atlético Colegiales (Argentina) players
Unión San Felipe footballers
San Marcos de Arica footballers
Cortuluá footballers
Chilean Primera División players
Primera B de Chile players
Primera B Metropolitana players
Categoría Primera B players
Chilean expatriate sportspeople in Argentina
Chilean expatriate sportspeople in Colombia
Expatriate footballers in Argentina
Expatriate footballers in Colombia
Association football forwards